Palaeosynthemis is a genus of dragonflies.
The genus includes these species:
Palaeosynthemis alecto 
Palaeosynthemis cervula 
Palaeosynthemis cyrene 
Palaeosynthemis evelynae 
Palaeosynthemis gracilenta 
Palaeosynthemis kimminsi 
Palaeosynthemis primigenia 
Palaeosynthemis wollastoni

References

Synthemistidae